Bert Dietz (born 9 February 1969) is a German former racing cyclist. He won the Hessen-Rundfahrt in 1992.

Career
The biggest win of his career came already in 1995, when he won the queen stage in the Vuelta a España; he had ridden in the attack that day and was caught by leader Laurent Jalabert, but Jalabert allowed Dietz to finish first.

In 1996, Dietz was second in the Tour of Sweden, and in 1997 he won a stage in the Vuelta an Aragon. In 1999 he moved to RSG  Nürnberg, and in 2000 he ended his career, with the olympic road race being his final race. The next year, he started as a team leader for Team Olympiapark München.

Doping confession
On 21 May 2007, Dietz admitted in a TV-show for ARD that he had regularly used EPO since 1995, helped by the staff and medical team of the Telekom team. His confession triggered more confessions of former teammates, including Tour de France winner Bjarne Riis.

Major results

1990
2nd Overall Peace Race
1st Stage 3
2nd Overall Tour du Loir et Cher E Provost
1991
7th Overall Peace Race
1st Stage 6
1992
2nd Overall Peace Race
1st Stage 5
1995
1st Stage 12 Vuelta a España
1996
2nd Overall Tour of Sweden
1st Stage 3b
2nd HEW Cyclassics
3rd Trofeo Luis Puig
1997
1st Stage 1 Vuelta a Aragón
2nd Overall Bayern Rundfahrt
5th Overall Driedaagse van De Panne-Koksijde
1998
1st Stage 7 Peace Race
1999
9th E3 Prijs Vlaanderen
2000
1st Stage 6 Peace Race
6th Overall Niedersachsen Rundfahrt

References

External links
 

1969 births
Living people
German male cyclists
Sportspeople from Leipzig
East German male cyclists
People from Bezirk Leipzig
Cyclists from Saxony